M.L. "Larry" Mason (1906–1990) was a justice of the Iowa Supreme Court from July 19, 1965, to July 14, 1978, appointed from Cerro Gordo County, Iowa.

External links

References

Justices of the Iowa Supreme Court
1906 births
1990 deaths
20th-century American judges